The Sheregesh mine is a large iron mine located in Tashtagolsky District, Kemerovo Oblast, Russia
. Sheregesh represents one of the largest iron ore reserves in Russia and in the world having estimated reserves of 184.7 million tonnes of ore grading 35.8% iron metal.

References 

Iron mines in Russia